The Ariel Award for Best Breakthrough Performance (Spanish: Premio Ariel a Mejor Revelación Actoral) is a recent award presented by the Academia Mexicana de Artes y Ciencias Cinematográficas (AMACC) in Mexico. It has been awarded since the 2019 edition, replacing Best Male and Best Female Breakthrough categories, It is awarded in honor of the acting performance by a breakout acting artist.

Four actors have been the winners of the statuette, Benny Emmanuel was the first winner for his performance De la Infancia (2018). The current holder of the award is Adrián Ross for Summer White (2021).

Winners and nominees

See also 
 Academy Juvenile Award
 BAFTA Rising Star Award

References 

Ariel Awards
Awards for young actors